Lawn bowls at the 1980 Summer Paralympics consisted of nineteen events, thirteen for men and six for women.

Medal summary

Men's events

Women's events

References 

 

 
1980 Summer Paralympics events
1980
Paralympics